Revolutionary Communist Organisation can refer to:

Revolutionary Communist Organisation (Austria), a defunct Oehlerite group
Revolutionary Communist Organisation (India), a minor communist party
Revolutionary Communist Organisation, Nepal

Political party disambiguation pages